Dendrolimus is a genus of moths in the family Lasiocampidae. The genus was erected by Ernst Friedrich Germar in 1812.

Species 
Species include:
 Dendrolimus arizanus (Wileman, 1910)
 Dendrolimus kikuchii Matsumura, 1927
 Dendrolimus pini (Linnaeus, 1758)
 Dendrolimus punctatus (Walker, 1855)
 Dendrolimus spectabilis (Butler, 1877)
 Dendrolimus superans (Butler, 1877)
 Dendrolimus taiwanus (Matsumura, 1932)

References

External links 
 
 

Lasiocampidae
Moth genera